

National and public libraries

The National Library and the public libraries are both the functions of Kenya National Library Service which is mandated by the law under Cap 225 of the Laws of Kenya, April 1965. Currently there is one National Library which is located at Community-Upper Hill, Nairobi. There are 64 public libraries spread in different parts of the country. In addition, some of the county government have libraries under them which are either operational or nonoperational. Nairobi county has four libraries located at Kayole, Makadara, Dagoretti and McMillan Memorial Library at the Nairobi Central Business District (the oldest library in Nairobi).

Kenya National Library Service has a total of 64 branches spread in different parts of the country. The libraries offer varied services depending on location and mode of establishment.

Branches within Kenya National Library Service Network

Community libraries

Community libraries have been established through the support of donors, individuals and institutions within the country as a way of empowering disadvantaged communities, promoting increased literacy levels and as a way of promoting a reading culture within the country. Some of these libraries are:

Mathare Youth Sports Association Libraries (located in slums) – has two branches
Busia Community Library
Akili Community Libraries
Container Libraries in Kenya
Sidarec Community Library
Kigima Resource Centre
Elangata Wuas Resource Centre
Karen Roses Joint Body Resource Centre
Micato-Amshare Library and Resource Centre (located in Mukuru slums) – offers free services to the community

Academic libraries

Under this category are the libraries found in public academic institutions like the public universities, colleges, polytechnics and academies. These libraries mostly contain academic books and information resources relating to the subjects of concentration by those institutions. The leading academic Library in Kenya is under the University of Nairobi, the first university to be established in Kenya in 1956 as the Royal Technical College.

See also
 List of universities and colleges in Kenya

References

External links

 
Kenya
Libraries
Libraries